Algorail was a lake freighter owned and operated by Algoma Central. The ship was built by Collingwood Shipyards in Collingwood, Ontario and was launched in 1967. The ship sailed on the North American Great Lakes and the Saint Lawrence Seaway delivering coal/coke, aggregates, slag, iron ore/oxides, salt, fertilizers, grain products, gypsum, quartzite, or sand. The ship was laid up in 2016 and sold for scrap in 2018.

Description
Algorail had a gross tonnage (GT) of 16,157 and a deadweight tonnage (DWT) of 23,320.

Algorail was powered by four Fairbanks-Morse 10-38D8-1/8 diesel engines driving one shaft. The engines were rated at  combined. The vessel was also equipped with one  bow thruster and one  stern thruster. The ship had four holds, 17 hatches and is equipped with a  discharge boom that can swing 105 degrees to either side of the ship and discharges 3,810 tonnes per hour.

Service history
The ship was constructed by Collingwood Shipyards at their yard in Collingwood, Ontario with the yard number 189. Algorail was launched on 13 December 1967, christened on 1 April 1968 and completed that month. The second freighter of the name was registered at Sault Ste. Marie, Ontario for Algoma Central. A self-unloading bulk carrier, she is one of the last lake freighters built in the traditional two-superstructure style, with the bridge at the bow. The ship sails on the North American Great Lakes and the Saint Lawrence Seaway delivering coal/coke, aggregates, slag, iron ore/oxides, salt, fertilizers, grain products, gypsum, quartzite, or sand.

On 6 October 1972, Algorail collided with the pier at Holland, Michigan loaded with a cargo of salt. The pier tore a  hole in her bow, which caused the vessel to sink. The ship was refloated, repaired and put back into service. On 20 April 1999, Algorail ran aground at Green Bay, Wisconsin in the Fox River. The ship was undamaged, but attempts by two tugboats to free the ship damaged the docks at Green Bay. On 25 June 2013 she ran aground with a shipment of salt in the Saginaw River. Zilwaukee Dock Manager Jim Cnudde cited Algorails running aground as an indication that greater efforts should be made to keep the river dredged. The ship was freed after unloading some of her cargo into a barge. The ship was laid up at the end of 2016 and did not see service in 2017. In 2018, Algorail was sold to International Marine Salvage for scrap and towed to Port Colborne, Ontario to be broken up.

References

1967 ships
Great Lakes freighters
Algoma Central Marine
Transport in Sault Ste. Marie, Ontario
Ships built in Collingwood, Ontario